Joanna Hoareau (born 19 January 1979) is a Seychellois former sprinter and long jumper.

Representing Seychelles at the 1999 All-Africa Games, Joanna competed in the women's 100 metres, 200 metres and long jump. Although she failed to win a medal in any of these events, she was selected to take part in the Sydney Olympics the following year, running in the women's 100 metres: Hoareau finished sixth in heat seven of the qualifications with a time of 12.01 seconds and did not progress to the semi-finals.

Hoareau is the current national record holder in the women's 200 metres and 4 × 400 metres relay.

References

1979 births
Living people
Seychellois female sprinters
Olympic athletes of Seychelles
Athletes (track and field) at the 2000 Summer Olympics
African Games competitors for Seychelles
Athletes (track and field) at the 1999 All-Africa Games
Olympic female sprinters